The All-BAL First Team is an annual Basketball Africa League (BAL) honor bestowed on the best players in the league following every BAL season. The first selections were announced on 4 June 2021 after the inaugural season. Thus far, 10 players from four different teams have been named to the all-league team.

Selections

Statistics

By club 
US Monastir has delivered the most all-league selections, holding the record with five players.

By nationality 
Players from Tunisia have been selected to the All-BAL First Team the most, with a total of three selections among Tunisians.

Notes

References

All-First Team